Aoife Maud Budd (born 10 May 1980) is an Irish former cricketer who represented the Irish national team between 2000 and 2001. Her sister Una also represented Ireland between 1998 and 2005. Budd made her Women's One Day International debut in 2000 in a match against Pakistan women; she made 4*, her highest score in an ODI, and took 0/8 from 3 overs. Her last ODI appearance was in 2001, although in 2005, Budd was selected in a preliminary 18-person training squad for the 2005 Women's Cricket World Cup. She did not make the final squad, and was instead a reserve player for the tournament. 

In 2001, Budd was in the Ireland under-19 squad for the 2001 Women's European Cricket Championship. In 2002, Budd was awarded a cricket scholarship by Trinity College, Dublin.

References

External links
 
 

Living people
1980 births
Cricketers from Dublin (city)
Irish women cricketers
Ireland women One Day International cricketers
Alumni of Trinity College Dublin